Ted Jeffrey Otsuki is an American criminal of Japanese descent from Harlingen, Texas and a former member of the FBI Ten Most Wanted Fugitives list who was added as number 415. Otsuki, who had served seven years in prison in Texas for bank robbery, killed a Boston  police officer, Roy Joseph Sergei, and critically wounded another, Jorge Torres, after they came across him by mistake in an alley on October 9, 1987. At the time of the shooting Otsuki was on parole.

Disappearance and capture
Otsuki was wanted for the 1987 murder shooting of a Boston, Massachusetts police officer.  A murder warrant was then issued for Otsuki's arrest and capture and he was then traced by the police to the city of San Francisco, California. Otsuki was captured in Jalisco, Guadalajara on September 4, 1988 by a combined squad of both Federal Bureau of Investigation (FBI) and Mexican Federal agents.

Aftermath
Otsuki was found guilty of first degree homicide and sentenced to life in prison plus 20 years without the possibility of parole.

References

American murderers
Date of birth missing (living people)
FBI Ten Most Wanted Fugitives
Fugitives
Living people
American people of Japanese descent
1951 births